The vertical bar, is a glyph with various uses in mathematics, computing, and typography. It has many names, often related to particular meanings: Sheffer stroke (in logic), pipe, bar, or (literally the word "or"), vbar, and others.

Usage

Mathematics
The vertical bar is used as a mathematical symbol in numerous ways:
 absolute value: , read "the absolute value of x"
 cardinality: , read "the cardinality of the set S"
 conditional probability: , reads "the probability of X given Y"
 determinant: , read "the determinant of the matrix A".
 distance: , denoting the shortest distance between point  to line , so line  is perpendicular to line 
 divisibility: , read "a divides b" or "a is a factor of b", though Unicode also provides special 'divides' and 'does not divide' symbols (U+2223 and U+2224: ∣, ∤)
 function evaluation: , read "f of x, evaluated at x equals 4" (see subscripts at Wikibooks)
 length: , read "the length of the string s"
 norm: , read "the norm of the (greater-than-one-dimensional) vector " (note that absolute value is a one-dimensional norm), although a double vertical bar (see below) is more often used to avoid ambiguity.
 set-builder notation: , read "the set of x such that x is less than two". Often, a colon ':' is used instead of a vertical bar
 the Sheffer stroke in logic: , read "a nand b"
 subtraction: , read "f(x) from a to b", denoting . Used in the context of a definite integral with variable x.
 A vertical bar can be used to separate variables from fixed parameters in a function, for example , or in the notation for elliptic integrals.

The double vertical bar, is also employed in mathematics.
 parallelism: , read "the line  is parallel to the line "
 Norm: , read "the norm (length, size, magnitude etc.) of the vector x". People sometimes use two single bars in analogy to the absolute value, which is a one-dimensional norm.

In LaTeX mathematical mode, the ASCII vertical bar produces a vertical line, and \| creates a double vertical line (a | b \| c is set as ). See below about LaTeX in text mode.

Physics
The vertical bar is used in bra–ket notation in quantum physics. Examples:
 : the quantum physical state 
 : the dual state corresponding to the state above
 : the inner product of states  and 
 Supergroups in physics are denoted G(N|M), which reads "G, M vertical bar N"; here G denotes any supergroup, M denotes the bosonic dimensions, and N denotes the Grassmann dimensions.

Computing

Pipe 

A pipe is an inter-process communication mechanism originating in Unix, which directs the output (standard out and, optionally, standard error) of one process to the input (standard in) of another. In this way, a series of commands can be "piped" together, giving users the ability to quickly perform complex multi-stage processing from the command line or as part of a Unix shell script ("bash file"). In most Unix shells (command interpreters), this is represented by the vertical bar character. For example:

 grep -i 'blair' filename.log | more 

where the output from the grep process (all lines containing 'blair') is piped to the more process (which allows a command line user to read through results one page at a time).

The same "pipe" feature is also found in later versions of DOS and Microsoft Windows.

This usage has led to the character itself being called "pipe".

Disjunction
In many programming languages, the vertical bar is used to designate the logic operation or, either bitwise or or logical or.

Specifically, in C and other languages following C syntax conventions, such as C++, Perl, Java and C#, a | b denotes a bitwise or; whereas a double vertical bar a || b denotes a (short-circuited) logical or. Since the character was originally not available in all code pages and keyboard layouts, ANSI C can transcribe it in form of the trigraph ??!, which, outside string literals, is equivalent to the | character.

In regular expression syntax, the vertical bar again indicates logical or (alternation). For example: the Unix command grep -E 'fu|bar' matches lines containing 'fu' or 'bar'.

Concatenation
The double vertical bar operator "||" denotes string concatenation in PL/I, standard ANSI SQL, and theoretical computer science (particularly cryptography).

Delimiter
Although not as common as commas or tabs, the vertical bar can be used as a delimiter in a flat file. Examples of a pipe-delimited standard data format are LEDES 1998B and HL7. It is frequently used because vertical bars are typically uncommon in the data itself.

Similarly, the vertical bar may see use as a delimiter for regular expression operations (e.g. in sed). This is useful when the regular expression contains instances of the more common forward slash (/) delimiter; using a vertical bar eliminates the need to escape all instances of the forward slash. However, this makes the bar unusable as the regular expression "alternative" operator.

Backus–Naur form
In Backus–Naur form, an expression consists of sequences of symbols and/or sequences separated by '|', indicating a choice, the whole being a possible substitution for the symbol on the left.

Concurrency operator
In calculi of communicating processes (like pi-calculus), the vertical bar is used to indicate that processes execute in parallel.

APL
The pipe in APL is the modulo or residue function between two operands and the absolute value function next to one operand.

List comprehensions

The vertical bar is used for list comprehensions in some functional languages, e.g. Haskell and Erlang. Compare set-builder notation.

Text markup

The vertical bar is used as a special character in lightweight markup languages, notably MediaWiki's Wikitext (in the templates and internal links).

In LaTeX text mode, the vertical bar produces an em dash (—). The \textbar command can be used to produce a vertical bar.

Phonetics and orthography

In the Khoisan languages and the International Phonetic Alphabet, the vertical bar is used to write the dental click. A double vertical bar is used to write the alveolar lateral click. Since these are technically letters, they have their own Unicode code points in the Latin Extended-B range: U+01C0 for the single bar and U+01C1 for the double bar.

Some Northwest and Northeast Caucasian languages written in the Cyrillic script have a vertical bar called palochka, indicating the preceding consonant is an ejective.

Longer single and double vertical bars are used to mark prosodic boundaries in the IPA.

Literature

Punctuation
In medieval European manuscripts, a single vertical bar was a common variant of the virgula  used as a period, scratch comma, and caesura mark.

In Sanskrit and other Indian languages, a single vertical mark, a danda, has a similar function as a period (full stop). Two bars || (a 'double danda') is the equivalent of a pilcrow in marking the end of a stanza, paragraph or section. The danda has its own Unicode code point, U+0964.

Poetry

It marks the strong break or caesura common to many forms of poetry, particularly Old English verse. It is also traditionally used to mark the division between lines of verse printed as prose (the style preferred by Oxford University Press), though it is now often replaced by the forward slash.

Notation
In the Geneva Bible and early printings of the King James Version, a double vertical bar is used to mark margin notes that contain an alternative translation from the original text. These margin notes always begin with the conjunction "Or". In later printings of the King James Version, the double vertical bar is irregularly used to mark any comment in the margins.

Music scoring

In music, when writing chord sheets, single vertical bars associated with a colon (|: A / / / :|) represents the beginning and end of a section (e.g. Intro, Interlude, Verse, Chorus) of music. Single bars can also represent the beginning and end of measures (|: A / / / | D / / / | E / / / :|).  A double vertical bar associated with a colon can represent the repeat of a given section (||: A / / / :|| - play twice).

Encoding

Solid vertical bar vs broken bar 

Many early video terminals and dot-matrix printers rendered the vertical bar character as the allograph broken bar . This may have been to distinguish the character from the lower-case 'L' and the upper-case '' on these limited-resolution devices, and to make a vertical line of them look more like a horizontal line of dashes. It was also (briefly) part of the ASCII standard.

An initial draft for a 7-bit character set that was published by the X3.2 subcommittee for Coded Character Sets and Data Format on June 8, 1961, was the first to include the vertical bar in a standard set. The bar was intended to be used as the representation for the logical OR symbol. A subsequent draft on May 12, 1966, places the vertical bar in column 7 alongside regional entry codepoints, and formed the basis for the original draft proposal used by the International Standards Organisation. This draft received opposition from the IBM user group SHARE, with its chairman, H. W. Nelson, writing a letter to the American Standards Association titled "The Proposed revised American Standard Code for Information Interchange does NOT meet the needs of computer programmers!"; in this letter, he argues that no characters within the international subset designated at columns 2-5 of the character set would be able to adequately represent logical OR and logical NOT in languages such as IBM's PL/I universally on all platforms. As a compromise, a requirement was introduced where the exclamation mark (!) and circumflex (^) would display as logical OR (|) and logical NOT (¬) respectively in use cases such as programming, while outside of these use cases they would represent their original typographic symbols:

In the 1967 revision of ASCII, along with the equivalent ISO 464 code published the same year, the code point was defined to be a broken vertical bar, and the exclamation mark character was allowed to be rendered as a solid vertical bar. However, the 1977 revision (ANSI X.3-1977) undid the changes made in the 1967 revision, enforcing that the circumflex could no longer be stylised as a logical NOT symbol, the exclamation mark likewise no longer allowing stylisation as a vertical bar, and defining the code point originally set to the broken bar as a solid vertical bar instead; the same changes were also reverted in ISO 646-1973 published four years prior.

Some variants of EBCDIC included both versions of the character as different code points. The broad implementation of the extended ASCII ISO/IEC 8859 series in the 1990s also made a distinction between the two forms. This was preserved in Unicode as a separate character at U+00A6 BROKEN BAR (the term "parted rule" is used sometimes in Unicode documentation). Some fonts draw the characters the same (both are solid vertical bars, or both are broken vertical bars). The broken bar does not appear to have any clearly identified uses distinct from those of the vertical bar. In non-computing use — for example in mathematics, physics and general typography — the broken bar is not an acceptable substitute for the vertical bar.

Many keyboards with US or US-International layout display the broken bar on a keycap even though the solid vertical bar character is produced in modern operating systems. This includes many German QWERTZ keyboards. This is a legacy of keyboards manufactured during the 1980s and 1990s for IBM PC compatible computers featuring the broken bar, as such computers used IBM's 8-bit Code page 437 character set based on ASCII, which continued to display the glyph for the broken bar at codepoint 7C on displays from MDA (1981) to VGA (1987) despite the changes made to ASCII in 1977.

It can be inserted into HTML as 

In some dictionaries, the broken bar is used to mark stress that may be either primary or secondary.

Unicode code points
These glyphs are encoded in Unicode as follows:
  (single vertical line)
  (single broken line)
  (double vertical line: used in pairs to indicate norm)
  (Fullwidth form)
 
 
 
 
  (and various other box drawing characters in the range U+2500 to U+257F)

Code pages and other historical encodings

See also

Notes

References

Punctuation
Typographical symbols
Logic symbols